Events in the year 1806 in art.

Events
18 January – The British Institution opens the former Boydell Shakespeare Gallery in Pall Mall, London, as the "British Gallery", alternating the world's first regular temporary exhibitions of Old Master paintings with sale exhibitions of the work of living artists.

Works

 Antonio Canova – Napoleon as Mars the Peacemaker (bronze nude)
 Anne-Louis Girodet de Roussy-Trioson – Charles-Marie Bonaparte
 John Hoppner – Sleeping Venus and Cupid
 Jean-Antoine Houdon – Portrait bust of Napoleon
 Jean Auguste Dominique Ingres
 
 Mademoiselle Caroline Rivière
 Napoleon I on his Imperial Throne
 Thomas Lawrence – Lady Georgiana Fane (approximate date)
 Henry Raeburn – Lord Newton (approximate date)
 Philipp Otto Runge – The Hülsenbeck Children
 Benjamin West 
The Death of Nelson
Thetis Bringing the Armor to Achilles (second version)
 David Wilkie
 The Blind Fiddler
 King Alfred burning the cakes

Births
10 January – Louis Joseph César Ducornet, French painter (used his feet) (died 1856)
13 January – Eugen Napoleon Neureuther, German painter and illustrator (died 1882)
25 January – Daniel Maclise, Irish-born painter (died 1870)
1 February – George Harvey, Scottish genre painter (died 1876)
22 February – Antoine Wiertz, Belgian painter (died 1865)
8 March – Antonio María Esquivel, Spanish Romantic painter (died 1857)
12 April – Peter Rindisbacher, Swiss-born anthropological painter (died 1834)
2 May – Marc-Charles-Gabriel Gleyre, Swiss painter (born 1874)
4 June – Daniel Macnee, Scottish portrait painter (died 1882)
11 June – James Ballantine, Scottish painter and author (died 1877)
28 July – Alexander Andreyevich Ivanov, Russian painter who adhered to Neoclassicism (died 1858)
19 September – William Dyce, Scottish-born painter (died 1864)
24 September – Niels Christian Kierkegaard, Danish draftsman and lithographer (died 1882)
October (10 or 12) – David Scott, Scottish historical painter (died 1849)

Deaths
6 January – Jean Henri Riesener, German furniture designer (born 1734)
22 February – James Barry, Irish painter, one of the earliest romantic painters working in Britain (born 1741)
17 March – Rienk Jelgerhuis, Dutch painter, engraver and draftsman (born 1729)
 April – John Russell, English portrait painter (born 1745)
8 April – Robert Barker, itinerant portrait painter (born 1739)
26 April – Václav Bernard Ambrosi, Czech miniature painter (born 1723)
5 June – Gabriel François Doyen, French painter (born 1726)
3 July – Carlo Magini, Italian painter of the Baroque period (born 1720)
10 July – George Stubbs, British painter, best known for his paintings of horses (born 1724)
22 August – Jean-Honoré Fragonard, French painter and printmaker (born 1732)
23 August – Johann Eleazar Zeissig, German genre, portrait and porcelain painter, and engraver (born 1737)
9 October – Friedrich August Brand, Austrian painter and engraver of historical subjects and landscapes (born 1735)
10 October – Therese Maron, German painter active in Rome (born 1725)
22 October – Thomas Sheraton, English furniture designer (born 1751)
31 October – Utamaro, Japanese printmaker and painter, especially of woodblock prints (ukiyo-e) (born 1753)
 date unknown
 Abraham Ezekiel Ezekiel, English engraver (born 1757)
 Henry Pelham, American painter, engraver, and cartographer (born 1748/1749) (drowned)
 Johann Dallinger von Dalling, Austrian painter (born 1741)
 probable – Danwon, Korean painter of the late Joseon period (born 1745)

References

 
Years of the 19th century in art
1800s in art